Taketo (written: 岳人 or 勇人) is a masculine Japanese given name. Notable people with the name include:

, Japanese basketball player and coach
Taketo Gohara, Japanese musician
, Japanese footballer

Taketō or Taketou (written: 武任) is a separate given name, though it may be romanized the same way. Notable people with the name include:

, Japanese samurai

Japanese masculine given names